Fariman Rural District is a rural district (dehestan) in the Central District of Fariman County, Razavi Khorasan Province, Iran. At the 2006 census, its population was 9,351, in 2,178 families.  The rural district has 26 villages.

References 

Rural Districts of Razavi Khorasan Province
Fariman County